Jurengraulis juruensis, the Jurua anchovy, is a species of freshwater anchovy that is found in the Amazon River and its tributaries in Bolivia and Brazil.  It is the only species in its genus.

References

Anchovies
Monotypic ray-finned fish genera
Fish of Bolivia
Freshwater fish of Brazil
Fauna of the Amazon
Fish described in 1898
Taxa named by George Albert Boulenger